The Canadian Agency for Drugs and Technologies in Health, or CADTH, is a Canadian national organisation that provides research and analysis to healthcare decision-makers.

The organisation was established in 1989 by the country's federal government, and those of its provinces and territories. Before April 2006, CADTH was known as the Canadian Coordinating Office for Health Technology Assessment (CCOHTA).

See also 
 International Conference on Harmonisation of Technical Requirements for Registration of Pharmaceuticals for Human Use (ICH)
 Food and Drug Administration (FDA, USA)
 European Medicines Agency (EMEA, EU)
 Ministry of Health, Labour and Welfare (Japan)
 Health Canada

References

External links
 CADTH
 International Network of Agencies for Health Technology Assessment

Medical and health organizations based in Ontario
Non-profit organizations based in Ottawa
Pharmaceuticals policy
1989 establishments in Canada
Organizations established in 1989